Krasavino is a rural locality (a village) in Nyuksenskoye Rural Settlement, Nyuksensky District, Vologda Oblast, Russia. The population was 119 as of 2002. There are 4 streets.

Geography 
Krasavino is located 37 km northeast of Nyuksenitsa (the district's administrative centre) by road. Gora is the nearest rural locality.

References 

Rural localities in Nyuksensky District